Kettle is an unincorporated community in Roane County, West Virginia, United States.

The community takes its name from nearby summit which has an outline in the form of a kettle.

References

Unincorporated communities in Roane County, West Virginia
Unincorporated communities in West Virginia